Dr. Samuel DuBois Cook (November 21, 1928 - May 29, 2017) was a political scientist, professor, author, administrator, human rights activist, and civil servant.  Dr. Cook is best known for serving as the first African-American faculty member at Duke University, in 1966, as well as serving as the President of Dillard University from 1975 to 1997.  In addition to these accomplishments, Dr. Cook was also appointed to the National Council on the Humanities by President Jimmy Carter and the United States Holocaust Memorial Council by President Bill Clinton.  Furthermore, he also served as the first black president of the Southern Political Science Association.

Education 
Dr. Cook attended Morehouse College where he received an A.B. degree. While at Morehouse College, Dr. Cook was the founder and student body president of the campuses chapter of the National Association for the Advancement of Colored People (NAACP). He was a member of the Omega Psi Phi fraternity He also received a M.A. and Ph.D. from The Ohio State University. Dr. Cook was a member of the Phi Beta Kappa honor society. He has honorary degrees from Morehouse College, The Ohio State University, Dillard University, Illinois College, Duke University, the University of New Orleans and Chicago Theological Seminar.

Career 
Dr. Cook was a Korean War Veteran and an ordained Deacon. He began teaching at Southern University and Atlanta University. At Atlanta University, Dr. Cook held a chair position in the Political Science Department. Utilizing this position, Dr. Cook participated in the Civil Rights Movement by moderating meetings between activists and students. In 1966, Dr. Cook became the first Black professor to hold a regular faculty position at a white southern university when he accepted a position at Duke University. Dr. Cook spent 22 years as the President of Dillard University in New Orleans, beginning in 1975. While serving as president of Dillard University, Cook founded the Center for Black-Jewish relations.

Legacy 
Samuel DuBois Cook is remembered for promoting positive societal change through his analysis of the impact of race in post World War II southern politics and advancing equality for all American citizens during his time as a scholar and activist. Dr. Cook also played a prominent role in promoting a shift in relations between African Americans and Jewish Americans with his establishment of the Center for Black-Jewish relations while serving as the President of Dillard University. Dr. Cook was a friend and classmate of a fellow civil rights activist Dr. Martin Luther King Jr. He was the president of the Association for the Study of African American Life and History. Moreover, he held a chair position of the Presidents of the United Negro College Fund.

References 

Duke University faculty
NAACP activists
Dillard University faculty
1928 births
2017 deaths
American political scientists
People from Griffin, Georgia